The consensus 1949 College Basketball All-American team, as determined by aggregating the results of four major All-American teams.  To earn "consensus" status, a player must win honors from a majority of the following teams: the Associated Press, Look Magazine, The United Press International, and Collier's Magazine.

1949 Consensus All-America team

Individual All-America teams

AP Honorable Mention

Paul Arizin, Villanova
Cliff Barker, Kentucky
Leo Barnhorst, Notre Dame
Leroy Chollet, Canisius
Chuck Cooper, Duquesne
Paul Courty, Oklahoma
Dick Dickey, North Carolina State
Pete Elliott, Michigan
Bill Erickson, Illinois
Bill Evans, Drake
Ed Gayda, Washington State
Chet Giermak, William & Mary
Bob Harrison, Michigan
Rene Herrerias, San Francisco
Jack Kerris, Loyola (Illinois)
Lou Lehman, Saint Louis
Slater Martin, Texas
Dick McGuire, St. John's
Vern Mikkelsen, Hamline
Joe Noertker, Virginia
Ralph O'Brien, Butler
John Oldham, Western Kentucky
J. L. Parks, Oklahoma A&M
Warren Perkins, Tulane
Sam Ranzino, North Carolina State
Don Rehfeldt, Wisconsin
Jim Riffey, Tulane
Frank Saul , Seton Hall
Fred Schaus, West Virginia
Chuck Share, Bowling Green
Bill Sharman, Southern California
Paul Unruh, Bradley
Paul Walther, Tennessee
Howie Williams, Purdue
Johnny Wilson, Anderson

See also
 1948–49 NCAA men's basketball season

References

NCAA Men's Basketball All-Americans
All-Americans